Richard Gorges (c.1730-1780) of Eye Court, Herfordshire, was a Member of Parliament for Leominster 1754-61.

Origins
He was the eldest son of Richard Gorges of Eye by Elizabeth Rodd, a daughter of John Rodd of Hereford.

Marriage
He married Frances Fettiplace (1735-1800), eldest daughter of Thomas Fettiplace of Swinbrooke, Oxfordshire.

References

1780 deaths
Year of birth uncertain